Paowalee Pornpimon b. 2 January 1992), born Pornpimon Fuengfung, is a Thai Luk thung singer.

Early life 
She was born in Dan Chang District, Suphan Buri Province, Thailand. She graduated from Ramkhamhaeng University.

Career 
Her film debut was in the 2011 movie The Moon, a biopic of Thai singer Pumpuang Duangjan. Since then, she portrayed herself in the 2013 movie Luam Phon Khon Luk Thung Nguen Lan and acted in the TV shows Saifah Gup Somwang and Trick or Treat.

Discography

Albums

Collaborations
 2011 – Lom Pad Lom Pay (with Charkkaphan Kornburiteerachote and Preawa Pacharee)
 2012 – Rak Kham Na (with Saranyu Winaipanit)
 2013 – Num Na Khao Sao Na Gluea (with Phai Phongsathon; original by Sornphet Pinyo and Nong-nuch Duangcheewan)
 2015 – Pha Lang Ngan Jon (with Labanoon)
 2016 – Klang Jai Ther Kue Chan Klang Jai Chan Kue Ther (with Pusin Warinrak)
 2018 – Bun Kao (with Lanpholen Wongsakorn)

Filmography
 2011 – The Moon – as Pumpuang Duangjan
 2013 – Luam Phon Khon Luk Thung Nguen Lan – as herself

References

1992 births
Living people
Paowalee Pornpimon
Paowalee Pornpimon
Paowalee Pornpimon